A minbar (sometimes romanized as mimber) is a pulpit in a mosque where the imam (leader of prayers) stands to deliver sermons (khutbah). It is also used in other similar contexts, such as in a Hussainiya where the speaker sits and lectures the congregation.

Etymology 
The word is a derivative of the Arabic root  n-b-r ("to raise, elevate"); the Arabic plural is manābir.

Function and form 
The minbar is symbolically the seat of the imam who leads prayers in the mosque and delivers sermons. In the early years of Islam, this seat was reserved for the Islamic prophet Muhammad and later for the caliphs who followed him, each of whom was officially the imam of the whole Muslim community, but it eventually became standard for all Friday mosques and was used by the local imam. Nonetheless, the minbar retained its significance as a symbol of authority.

While minbars are roughly similar to church pulpits, they have a function and position more similar to that of a church lectern, being used instead by the imam for a wide range of readings and prayers. The minbar is located to the right of the mihrab, a niche in the far wall of the mosque that symbolizes the direction of prayer (i.e. towards Mecca). It is usually shaped like a small tower with a seat or kiosk-like structure at its top and a staircase leading up to it. The bottom of the staircase often has a doorway or portal. In contrast to many Christian pulpits, the steps up to the minbar are usually in a straight line on the same axis as the seat.

In some mosques, there is a platform (müezzin mahfil in Turkish) opposite the minbar where the assistant of the Imam, the muezzin, stands during prayer. The muezzin recites the answers to the prayers of the imam where applicable.

History 

The first recorded minbar in the Islamic world was Muhammad's minbar in Medina, created in 629 CE (or between 628 and 631 CE) and consisting simply of two steps and a seat, resembling a throne. After Muhammad's death this minbar continued to be used as a symbol of authority by the caliphs who followed him. The Umayyad caliph Mu'awiya I (ruled 661–680) heightened Muhammad's original minbar by increasing the number of steps from three to six, thus increasing its prominence. During the Umayyad period the minbar was used by the caliphs or their representative governors to make important public announcements and to deliver the Friday sermon (khutba). In the last years of the Umayyad Caliphate, before its fall in 750, the Umayyads ordered minbars to be constructed for all the Friday mosques of Egypt, and soon afterward this practice was extended to other Muslim territories. By the early Abbasid period (after 750) it had become standard in Friday mosques across all Muslim communities.

Minbars thus quickly developed into a symbol of political and religious legitimacy for Muslim authorities. It was one of the only major formal furnishings of a mosque and was thus an important architectural feature in itself. More importantly, however, it was the setting for the weekly Friday sermon which, notably, usually mentioned the name of the current Muslim ruler over the community and included other public announcements of a religious or political nature. As a result, later Muslim rulers sometimes invested considerable expense in commissioning richly-decorated minbars for the main mosques of their major cities.

The oldest Islamic pulpit in the world to be preserved up to the present day is the minbar of the Great Mosque of Kairouan in Kairouan, Tunisia. It dates from around 860 or 862 CE, under the tenure of the Aghlabid governor Abu Ibrahim Ahmad, and was imported in whole or in part from Baghdad. It is an eleven-step staircase made of over 300 sculpted pieces of teak wood (a material imported from India). Thanks to its age and the richness of its decoration, it is considered an important piece of historic Islamic art. Other famous examples of medieval minbars include the Almoravid Minbar in Marrakesh, commissioned in 1137 by Ali ibn Yusuf, and the Minbar of the al-Aqsa Mosque (also commonly known as the Minbar of Saladin) in Jerusalem, commissioned in 1168-69 by Nur ad-Din.

Woodwork was the primary medium for the construction of minbars in much of the Middle East and North Africa up until the Ottoman period. These wooden minbars were in many cases very intricately decorated with geometric patterns and carved arabesques (vegetal and floral motifs), as well as with Arabic calligraphic inscriptions (often recording the minbar's creation or including Qur'anic verses). In some cases they also featured delicate inlay work with ivory or mother-of-pearl. Many workshops created minbars that were assembled from hundreds of pieces held together using an interlocking technique and wooden pegs, but without glue or metal nails. In addition to the already-mentioned Almoravid Minbar and the Minbar of Saladin, other highly accomplished examples of this style are the Minbar of the Ibrahimi Mosque in Hebron (commissioned in 1091), the minbar of the Qarawiyyin Mosque (completed in 1144), and the Minbar of al-Ghamri (now housed at the Khanqah of Sultan Barsbay) in Cairo (circa 1451).

Stone minbars were sometimes produced in this early period too, as with the example of the minbar of the Mosque of Sultan Hasan in Cairo (14th century). During the Ottoman period, however, stone and marble became increasingly favoured materials for new minbars, though often with simplified ornamentation compared to earlier wooden versions. An accomplished example of this genre, still featuring rich decoration, is the minbar of the Selimiye Mosque in Edirne (late 16th century). Stone minbars in various styles were also favoured in the Indian subcontinent; earlier wooden minbars may have been common here but few have been preserved.

References

Further reading

 Pedersen, J.; Golmohammadi, J.; Burton-Page, J.; Freeman-Grenville, G.S.P. (2012). "Minbar". In Bearman, P.; Bianquis, Th.; Bosworth, C.E.; van Donzel, E.; Heinrichs, W.P. (eds.). Encyclopaedia of Islam, Second Edition. Brill.
 Bloom, Jonathan; Toufiq, Ahmed; Carboni, Stefano; Soultanian, Jack; Wilmering, Antoine M.; Minor, Mark D.; Zawacki, Andrew; Hbibi, El Mostafa (1998). The Minbar from the Kutubiyya Mosque. The Metropolitan Museum of Art, New York; Ediciones El Viso, S.A., Madrid; Ministère des Affaires Culturelles, Royaume du Maroc.
 Lynette Singer (2008). The Minbar of Saladin. Reconstructing a Jewel of Islamic Art. (London: Thames & Hudson).

Islamic architectural elements
Mosque architecture
Pulpits
Islamic terminology
Minbars
Religious furniture